Sold! is an American reality television series on History that premiered on April 11, 2012. The series chronicles the activities of Rick Bryant, owner of Bryant Auction, and his team located in Missouri. Each episode details the process of auctioning, showing the appraisal, acquisition and eventual auctioning of the items.

Episodes

References

2010s American reality television series
2012 American television series debuts
2012 American television series endings
English-language television shows
History (American TV channel) original programming